Pekka Ala-Pietilä, January 13.1957, Asikkala, is   CEO and co-founder of Blyk. He was also President of Nokia Corporation (1999–2005) and President of Nokia Mobile Phones (1992–1998). He holds an honorary Doctor in Technology from Tampere University of Technology and in Science from the University of Helsinki, and is a Knight 1st Class of the Order of the White Rose of Finland.

References

Finnish chief executives
Nokia people
Living people
1957 births
Finnish company founders
Tampere University of Technology alumni
University of Helsinki alumni